Tenthras is a genus of beetles in the family Cerambycidae, containing the following species:

 Tenthras obliteratus Thomson, 1864
 Tenthras setosus Monné & Tavakilian, 1990

References

Acanthocinini